John O'Connor ( – 12 January 1891) was an Irish nationalist politician who was elected in 1885 as Lord Mayor of Dublin and also as a Member of Parliament (MP) for South Kerry.

O'Connor was the son of a farmer at Staplestown, Co. Kildare, and owned several public houses.  He married the daughter of a pawnbroker, a Mr White. He was an alderman of Dublin Corporation and Lord Mayor in 1885.

At the general election in December 1885 he won the newly created South Kerry constituency for the Irish Parliamentary Party by more than 20 to 1 over the "Loyalist" candidate, taking his seat in the House of Commons of the United Kingdom of Great Britain and Ireland.  O'Connor was re-elected unopposed in 1886, but resigned his seat in September 1887.

References

Sources
 The Times (London), 1 December 1885
 Brian M. Walker (ed.), Parliamentary Election Results in Ireland, 1801-1922, Dublin, Royal Irish Academy, 1978

External links 
 

1830s births
1891 deaths
Year of birth uncertain
Irish Parliamentary Party MPs
Members of the Parliament of the United Kingdom for County Kerry constituencies (1801–1922)
Lord Mayors of Dublin
Politicians from County Kildare
UK MPs 1885–1886
UK MPs 1886–1892